Hetényi is a Hungarian surname. Notable people with the surname include:

Antal Hetényi (1947–2023), Hungarian judoka
Ernő Hetényi (1912–1999), Hungarian tibetologist
István Hetényi (1926–2008), Hungarian politician
Miklós Imre Hetényi (1906–1984), Hungarian and american engineering scientist.
Zoltán Hetényi (born 1988), Hungarian ice hockey player

Hungarian-language surnames